Robert William Smith may refer to:
 Robert W. Smith (writer) (1926–2011), American martial artist and writer
 Robert W. Smith (musician) (1958), American composer and arranger
 Robert William Smith (politician) (1871–1958), New Zealand Liberal Party politician
 Robert William Smith (surgeon) (1807–1873), Irish surgeon and pathologist
 Bobby Smith (footballer, born 1944), English footballer